Olaf Aarvold (3 February 1899, Gjerpen - 3 August 1991) was a Norwegian priest and politician for the Liberal Party.

He graduated from upper secondary school in 1922, and worked as a teacher in Larvik from 1923 to 1925. In 1929 he graduated with the cand.theol. degree from the MF Norwegian School of Theology. He worked as a priest in Durban 1930, Rouen 1935 and Antwerp 1936. In 1940 he returned to Norway as vicar in Tysnes. Having been imprisoned by the German occupants from 1943 to 1945, first in Espeland concentration camp from September 1943 to January 1944 and then Grini concentration camp until the war's end, he moved on to become chaplain in Bergen in 1946. He was appointed vicar in Eidanger in 1957.

He served as a deputy representative to the Parliament of Norway from Bergen during the terms 1950–1953, 1954–1957, and 1958–1961. He met during 35 days of parliamentary session. On the local level he was a member of the executive committee of Eidanger municipal council from 1960 to 1963.

In 1930 he married Gudrun Johansen; the couple had three children.

References

1899 births
1991 deaths
Politicians from Skien
Liberal Party (Norway) politicians
Deputy members of the Storting
Politicians from Bergen
Norwegian Lutherans
Norwegian priests
Lutheran chaplains
MF Norwegian School of Theology, Religion and Society alumni
Norwegian resistance members
Espeland concentration camp prisoners
Grini concentration camp survivors
Politicians from Porsgrunn
20th-century Lutherans